Lazar Iosifovich Kogan (November 7, 1889 – March 3, 1939) was a Soviet secret police (Cheka, OGPU, NKVD) high-ranking functionary, chief of the Gulag (1930–1932) and deputy chief of the Gulag (1932–1936).

Biography
Born in Elovka, Krasnoyarsk Krai, in the Yeniseysk Governorate of the Russian Empire, 
he was the son of a wealthy Jewish merchant. His father was a fur trader. An active participant in the revolutionary movement, at first an anarcho-communist. In 1908, a Kiev military district court sentenced him to death for participating in looting with a gun in his hand. This punishment was then converted into a life sentence.

Kogan joined the Russian Communist Party (b) in 1918.

His major positions include chief of the GULAG (1930–1932), deputy chief of the GULAG (1932–1936), deputy Narkom of Forest Industry (1936–1937).

Until August 1936, Kogan was the head of the construction of the Belomorsk Baltic Canal. Measuring  and connecting the Baltic Sea with the White Sea, the canal was built in 20 months by 170,000 Gulag prisoners. Kogan was a member of the Central Executive Committee of the Soviet Union from 1935 to 1937.

He is mentioned from this period by Aleksandr Solzhenitsyn in The Gulag Archipelago: "It is time to put six names on the slopes of this channel – the main helpers of Stalin and Yagoda, the main supervisors of Belomor canal, six mercenary killers, after each of them thirty thousand deaths victims: Firin – Berman – Frenkel – Kogan – Rappoport – Zhuk".

Kogan was arrested on 31 January 1938. While imprisoned, he wrote several repentance letters to Nikolay Yezhov, then to Lavrentiy Beria. He was nonetheless sentenced to death and shot on 3 March 1939 at the NKVD's Kommunarka shooting ground. He was rehabilitated in 1956.

Awards 
 Order of Lenin (1933)
 Order of the Red Banner

References

1889 births
1939 deaths
People from Yeniseysk Governorate
Russian Jews
Bolsheviks
Jewish socialists
Jewish Soviet politicians
NKVD officers
Gulag governors
Recipients of the Order of Lenin
Recipients of the Order of the Red Banner
Great Purge perpetrators
Great Purge victims from Russia
Jews executed by the Soviet Union
People executed for treason against the Soviet Union
Deaths by firearm in Russia
Soviet rehabilitations